Dome A or Dome Argus is the loftiest ice dome on the Antarctic Plateau, located  inland. It is thought to be the coldest naturally occurring place on Earth, with temperatures believed to reach . It is located near the center of East Antarctica, approximately midway between the enormous head of Lambert Glacier and the geographic South Pole, within the Australian claim.

Description
Dome Argus is located on the massive East Antarctic Ice Sheet and is the highest ice feature of Antarctica. Dome A is a lofty ice prominence, the highest rooftop of the Antarctic Plateau, and the elevation visually is not noticeable. Below this enormous dome, underneath at least  of ice sheet, lies the Gamburtsev Mountain Range, about the size of the European Alps.

The name "Dome Argus" was given by the Scott Polar Research Institute from Greek mythology. Argus built the ship Argo, in which Jason and the Argonauts traveled to Colchis in search of the Golden Fleece.

This site is one of the driest locations on Earth and receives  of snow per year. Due to this, as well as calm weather, this site is an excellent location to obtain ice core samples for the research of past climates. Temperatures at Dome A fall below  almost every winter.

Exploration
Details of the morphology of this feature were determined by the SPRI-NSF-TUD airborne radio echo sounding program between the years 1967 and 1979.

An automatic weather station (AWS) was deployed at Dome A, and a second station was installed approximately halfway between the summit and the coast at a site called Eagle (2830 m above sea level). The station at Dome A is powered by solar cells and diesel fuel and requires yearly service and refuelling.

Extreme temperatures
The lowest surface temperature ever measured on the surface of the Earth was recorded by satellite on August 10, 2010, between Dome Argus and Dome Fuji.

Observatory
The Polar Research Institute of China deployed a robotic observatory called PLATO (PLATeau Observatory) on the dome in January 2008. PLATO was designed and built by the University of New South Wales, Sydney, Australia to provide a platform from which astronomical observations and site-testing could be conducted. Various institutions from Australia, US, China and the UK provided instruments that were deployed with PLATO, these instruments included CSTAR, Gattini, PreHEAT, Snodar, Nigel and the PLATO web cameras.

The Institute of Remote Sensing Applications, Chinese Academy of Sciences  established a wireless network technology based observation system called Dome A-WSN on the dome in January 2008.

The Kunlun Station, China's third station in Antarctica, was set up at the dome on January 27, 2009. Thus far the Antarctic Kunlun Station is suitable as a summer station, but there are plans to develop it further and build an airfield nearby to ease servicing, as it is not reachable by helicopters.

See also
Pole of Cold
Pole of Inaccessibility
Ridge A
Dome C (also known as Dome Circe, Dome Charlie or Dome Concordia)
Dome F (also known as Dome Fuji or Valkyrie Dome)
East Antarctica Ranges
List of Ultras of Antarctica

References

Further reading
Li Yuansheng, Polar Research Institute of China (2005). Introduction to Chinese Dome A Inland Traverse.

External links
AAD website
NASA-USGS Landsat 8 Satellite Pinpoints Coldest Spots on Earth
PLATO – Dome A Robotic Observatory
Live Webcams From Dome A
International Polar Foundation coverage
PLATO – Dome A Robotic Observatory – Chinese Translation
China to Build Third Station in Antarctica (China Daily, Oct 14 2004)
Photo Gallery (People's Daily, Jan 19 2005)
Chinese Engineer Receives Medical Treatment After Falling Ill During Antarctic Traverse (US National Science Foundation, Jan 19 2005)
Expedition Photographs (People's Daily, Jan 21 2005)
An account of the Dome A expedition (Beijing Review, May 2005)
OpenStreetMap

East Antarctica
Plateaus of Antarctica
Outposts of Antarctica
Ice caps of Antarctica
Mountains of Antarctica
Australian Antarctic Territory
Extreme points of Earth